Salar Dul (also Romanized as Sālār Dūl, Sālār Del, and Salar Dool) is a village in Itivand-e Jonubi Rural District, Kakavand District, Delfan County, Lorestan Province, Iran. At the 2006 census, its population was 37, in 7 families.

References 

Towns and villages in Delfan County